Arnaud Blin is a French-American historian and political scientist. He has focused mainly on international relations and the history of war and peace, including the history of terrorism. He has published almost exclusively in French. His History of Terrorism (with G. Chaliand) was originally published in France and translated into English by the University of California Press.

Arnaud Blin blends historical analysis with current events and includes analysis of the Peace of Westphalia and the Westphalian system. He has written on the Battle of Jena and philosophical ideas such as the Hegelian idea of the end of history, or the Kantian theory of perpetual peace as applied to US Foreign policy through the doctrine of democratic peace.

He has worked for several research institutions, including the Institut Diplomacie et Défense, the French Institute for Strategic Analysis and the Ecole de la paix de Grenoble. Since 2008, he has been coordinator, with Gustavo Marín, of the Forum for a new World Governance.

Blin has degrees from Harvard University, Georgetown University and Tufts University.

Publications

In French
 Comment Roosevelt fit entrer les Etats-Unis dans la guerre, André Versaille, février 2011
 Tamerlan, Perrin, April 2007
 11 septembre, la terreur démasquée, Cavalier Bleu, août 2006
 Collectif, 100 propositions du Forum Social Mondial, Charles Léopold Mayer Publishing, 2006
 Histoire du terrorisme, Bayard Culture, March 2006
 Le terrorisme, Cavalier Bleu, coll. Idées reçues, numéro 108, 128 p.
 Le désarroi de la puissance, Les Etats-Unis vers la guerre permanente ?, Lignes De Repères, October 2004
 1648, La paix en Westphalie, ou la naissance de l'Europe politique moderne, Complexe, coll. « Questions à L'histoire », 2006, 240 p.

In English
 The History of Terrorism: From Antiquity to Al Qaeda, University of California Press, 2007
 War and Religion: Europe and the Mediterranean from the First through the Twenty-First Centuries, University of California Press, 2019.

References

External Links
 Arnaud Blin's articles on the Forum for a new World Governance
 Arnaud Blin's books on alibris.com

21st-century French historians
Living people
French male non-fiction writers
Year of birth missing (living people)
Georgetown University alumni
The Fletcher School at Tufts University alumni
Harvard University alumni